Jet Star, JetStar or Jetstar may refer to:

Aviation and automobiles
 Oldsmobile Jetstar I, an automobile produced in the 1964 and 1965 model years
 Oldsmobile Jetstar 88, an automobile produced in the 1964 through 1966 model years
 Lockheed JetStar, an executive jet
 Jetstar Airways, or its sister airlines - Jetstar Asia, Jetstar Pacific Airlines, Jetstar Japan, Jetstar Hong Kong and Valuair
 Apollo Jet Star, a Hungarian ultralight trike aircraft
 Mitsubishi Jetstar, an automobile by Mitsubishi

Leisure
 Jet Star (Casino Pier), a former roller coaster located at Casino Pier from 1970 to 2000
 Jet Star (Knoebels), a former roller coaster located at Knoebels Amusement Resort
 Jet Star (Luna Park), a roller coaster located at Luna Park La Palmyre
 Jet Star (Morey's Piers), a former roller coaster located at Morey's Piers
 Jet Star (Särkänniemi), the last Jet Star type of roller coaster built
 Jet Star 2 (Lagoon), a roller coaster at Lagoon Amusement Park in Farmington, Utah
 Jumbo Jet (Cedar Point)  Jet Star 3
 Jumbo Jet (Morey's Piers) a.k.a. Jet Star 3
 Jumbo Jet (Six Flags Great Adventure) a.k.a. Jet Star 3
 Star Jet, a former roller coaster which was located at Casino Pier from 2002 until it was destroyed by Hurricane Sandy in 2012 (and frequently misidentified as Jet Star)

Music
 Jet Star (record distribution company), a United Kingdom record distribution company
"Jet Star", a song by Blonde Redhead

See also
 Jet (disambiguation)
 Star (disambiguation)
 The Starjets, Irish pop band
 Lockheed L-133 Starjet, proposed jet fighter